The World Team Challenge is an international biathlon competition, which has been held every year between Christmas and New Year since 2002 in Veltins-Arena in Gelsenkirchen.
Previously a similar competition was held at the same time of year in Ruhpolding, but since 2001 the venue was changed due to financial troubles. The competition isn't part of the World Cup.

Statistics

Winners by edition

 The 2010 event was rescheduled for March 2011 because of the roof destruction.

Successful nations

Participating nations

Legend to the table
 • - one pair; 
 •• - two pairs and so on; 
 * - one athlete in a mixed pair.

References

External links 

 Official web page of the event

 
Biathlon competitions in Germany
Sports competitions in Gelsenkirchen
International sports competitions hosted by Germany
Recurring sporting events established in 2002
2002 establishments in Germany
December sporting events